Events from the year 1955 in Iran.

Incumbents
 Shah: Mohammad Reza Pahlavi 
 Prime Minister: Fazlollah Zahedi (until April 7), Hossein Ala' (starting April 7)

Events

Establishments 

 Ahvaz Jundishapur University of Medical Sciences
 Shahid Chamran University of Ahvaz

Births

 18 May – Farhad Moshiri
 29 September – Ali Shamkhani
 1 December – Azar Nafisi
 14 December - Ali Abolhassani

See also
 Years in Iraq
 Years in Afghanistan

References

 
Iran
Years of the 20th century in Iran
1950s in Iran
Iran